Allermöhe station is a railway station served by the city trains, located in Hamburg, Germany, in the quarter of Neuallermöhe in the borough Bergedorf.

History
The station was opened on 30 May 1999 to connect the newly developed residential area of Neuallermöhe West. It is the third newest S-Bahn station in Hamburg behind Hamburg Airport station and Fischbek station.

Station layout
The station is elevated with one island platform and two tracks.

Station services

Trains
The rapid transit trains of the line S21 and the line S2 of the Hamburg S-Bahn calls the station.

Buses
In front of the railway station is a bus stop.

See also

 Hamburger Verkehrsverbund (HVV)
 List of Hamburg S-Bahn stations

References

External links

 Line and route network plans at hvv.de 

Hamburg S-Bahn stations in Hamburg
Buildings and structures in Bergedorf
Hamburg Allermohe
Hamburg Allermohe